Gordy was the eighth ship of the  of the Soviet Navy.

Construction and career
The ship was built at Amur Shipbuilding Plant in Komsomolsk-on-Amur and was launched on 24 May 1960 and commissioned into the Pacific Fleet on 30 July 1987.

On November 15, 1961, the ship entered the Pacific Fleet of the Soviet Navy. On May 19, 1966, the ship was reclassified into a large missile ship (BRK). In 1967, the ship missile battalion was opposed to an American squadron led by the aircraft carrier USS Enterprise, which entered Soviet territorial waters. With the advent of Soviet fighters, the American squadron went into neutral waters. In the period from 28 to 31 March 1968, she paid a business visit to Madras and from 3 to 6 April - to Bombay (India).

From 1973 to 1975, she was modernized and rebuilt at Dalzavod according to Project 57-A. On June 20, 1975, reclassified as large anti-submarine ships.

On July 30, 1987, the destroyer was excluded from the combat strength of the Soviet Navy in connection with the delivery to the OFI for disarmament, dismantling and sale. On August 9, 1987, the ship's crew was disbanded. Subsequently, the ship's hull was used as a target ship and sunk in the Bering Sea off the coast of Kamchatka during rocket firing.

Gallery

References

In Russian

External links

 
 
Gallery of the ship. Navsource. Retrieved 11 August 2021

Ships built by Amur Shipbuilding Plant
Kanin-class destroyers
1960 ships
Cold War destroyers of the Soviet Union